One Love (The Album) is the second studio album by European-based Nigerian artist Dr. Alban. It was released in 1992 through BMG and Ariola. The album was also released as a second edition in 1993, with a different track listing.

Track listing

First edition
 "Introduction" (1:45)
 "It's My Life" (4:00)
 "Sing Hallelujah" (4:24)
 "Groove Machine 4" (3:41)
 "Reggae Gone Ragga" (4:01)
 "Cash Money" (3:36)
 "One Love" (5:27)
 "Om we rembwe ike" (4:47)
 "Groove Machine 5" (4:46)
 "Mata oh a eh" (4:20)
 "Roll Down Di Rubber Man" (5:39)
 "It's My Life (Club Edit)" (4:00)

Second edition
 "Introduction" (1:45)
 "It's My Life" (4:00)
 "One Love" (4:00)
 "Sing Hallelujah" (4:00)
 "Mata oh a eh" (4:20)
 "Reggae Gone Ragga" (4:01)
 "Om we rembwe ike" (4:47)
 "Hard To Choose" (3:53)
 "Cash Money" (3:36)
 "Roll Down Di Rubber Man" (5:39)
 "It's My Life (Remix)" (4:32)
 "One Love (Remix)" (4:30)

Charts

Sales and certifications

References

1992 albums
Dr. Alban albums